In 1933, under Title II of the Securities Act of 1933, and at the request of the United States Department of State, President Franklin D. Roosevelt, by Executive Order, created the Foreign Bondholders Protective Council to assist US citizens and creditors in collecting on defaulted foreign government bonds. Raymond B. Stevens was the Council's first president. Prior to formation of the private, non-profit FBPC, no permanent organization existed to negotiate settlements with defaulting debtors. The Council was particularly active before World War II, then again in the 1970s and 1980s. As recently as 2002, both the Department of State and the Securities and Exchange Commission recommended that creditors who hold more than 18,000 Chinese government bonds issued between 1913 and 1942 seek the FBPC's assistance in negotiating fair settlements. The FBPC works similarly to the UK's Corporation of Foreign Bondholders.

References

External links
 Annual reports of the CFB and FBPC. Digital collection by Stanford University Library.
 Guide to the Foreign Bondholders Protective Council Records. Finding aid from the Online Archive of California. The 99 linear feet of FBPC records are housed at Stanford University Library special collections manuscripts division.
Foreign Claims Settlement Commission.

Financial services in the United States
1933 establishments in the United States
Bonds (finance)